Vagabond Heart is the sixteenth studio album by British recording artist Rod Stewart, released on 26 March 1991 by Warner Bros. Records. The album reached No. 10 in the US, and reached No. 2 in the UK. The album features five singles, among them a cover of Robbie Robertson's song "Broken Arrow" (No. 20 in the US) and Van Morrison's song "Have I Told You Lately", which would become a hit two years later (in a live version) and is Stewart's most recent top five solo hit in the US and the UK. The two biggest hits from the album were "Rhythm of My Heart" (No. 3 in the UK/No. 5 in the US) and "The Motown Song" (No. 10 in the UK and US).

The "Vagabond Heart Tour" was made available on video in 1992, shot during a concert in Los Angeles on Valentine's Day.

Critical reception
Overall, the album received positive reviews. According to Rolling Stone, "Vagabond Heart finds Stewart rising to new challenges as both a songwriter and a singer. The strength of the songs and the depth of Stewart's conviction make this his most compelling work since the early 1970s." 

AllMusic felt the album was "stronger, more diverse album than its predecessor, Out of Order, featuring a more consistent set of songs."

Track listing

Notes
  signifies a co-producer
"Downtown Train" and "This Old Heart of Mine (Is Weak For You) are omitted on cassette copies, as well as some CD versions.

Personnel
(Personnel for the 12-track version of the album, excluding the tracks "Downtown Train" and "This Old Heart of Mine")
 "Rebel Heart", "It Takes Two", "When a Man's in Love", "You are Everything", "Go Out Dancing", "No Holding Back", "Have I Told You Lately", "Moment of Glory" and "If Only" arranged and produced by Rod Stewart and Bernard Edwards.  Recorded by Steve MacMillan.  Mixed by Bernard Edwards and Steve Macmillan.  Recording and mix assisted by John Karpowich, Gil Morales and Bryant Arnett.
Roy Galloway, Luther Waters, The Waters Sisters, Angela Winbush: backing vocals; Jeff Golub, Jim Cregan, Waddy Wachtel, Dann Huff: guitar; Carmine Rojas, Bernard Edwards: bass guitar; Chuck Kentis: keyboards, programming; Kevin Savigar: keyboards; Rave Calmer, Tony Brock: drums; Paulinho da Costa: percussion; Saxophone on "Go Out Dancing" and "Moment of Glory" by Jimmy Roberts; String arrangements on "When a Man's in Love" and "Have I Told You Lately" by Bruce Miller.
 "Rhythm of My Heart" produced by Trevor Horn.  Recorded by Steve MacMillan.  Mixed by Steve MacMillan and Trevor Horn.
Joe Turano, John Batdorf, Randel Crenshaw, Gary Falcone, Roger Freeland, Robert Jason, Arnold Stiefel, Lionel Conway, Garry Cook, Antony Arena: backing vocals; Robin Le Mesurier, Steve Lukather: guitar; Gary Taylor, Kevin Savigar, Richard Cottle: keyboards; Michael McNeil: accordion; Kevin Weed: bagpipes; Neil Stubenhaus: bass guitar; John Robinson: drums, percussion; Gary Maughn: programming; Choir arranged and directed by Nick Strimple and Joe Turano; Strings arranged and conducted by Kevin Savigar.
 "Broken Arrow" produced by Patrick Leonard; Co-produced by Lenny Waronker.  Recorded and mixed by Jerry Jordan, with assistance by Marc Moreau.
Twinkle Schascle: backing vocals; Tim Pierce: guitars; Patrick Leonard: keyboards; Jimmy Johnson: bass guitar; Jim Keltner: drums; Luis Conte: percussion
 "The Motown Song" arranged by David Paich. Produced by Richard Perry.  Recorded and mixed by Steve MacMillan, with recording assistance by Dee Ross and Eric Anest; Additional engineering by Lee Granados, John Karpowich, Scott Ralston and Eric Rudd.
The Temptations: backing vocals; Steve Lukather, Paul Jackson Jr.: guitar; Khris Kellow: keyboard bass; David Paich: acoustic piano, Fender Rhodes; Steve Porcaro: synthesizer; Steve Lindsey: synthesizer, synth horns; Jeff Porcaro: drums; Chris Trujillo: percussion; Horns arranged by Steve Lindsey.

Additional credits
 Mastered by Stephen Marcussen at Precision Mastering (Hollywood, CA).
 Production coordination: Malcolm Cullimore (tracks 1–6 & 8–12); Julie Larson (track 7).
 Project manager: Nancy Poertner
 Art direction: Jeri Heiden
 Design: Eric Handel
 Illustration: Ann Field
 Photography: Randee St. Nicholas

Publishing
"Rhythm of My Heart" copyright WB Music Corp./Jamm Music/Bibo Music Publishers.  "Rebel Heart", "When a Man's in Love" and "Moment of Glory" published by Rod Stewart (Intersong Music Admin.)/Cat in the Hat Music/Kentis Music/Malango Bro. "Broken Arrow" published by Medicine Hat Music.  "It Takes Two" published by Stone Agate Music Division.  "You Are Everything" published by Assorted Music/Bellboy Music/The Mighty Three Group.  "The Motown Song" published by Geffen Music/McNally Music Publishing/MCA Music Publishing.  "Go Out Dancing" published by Rod Stewart (Intersong Music Admin.)/Cat in the Hat Music/Kentis Music.  "No Holding Back" and "If Only" published by Rod Stewart (Intersong Music Admin.)/Almo Music Corp/Kevin Savigar Music/BMG Inc.  "Have I Told You Lately" published by PolyGram International Publishing, Inc.

Charts

Weekly charts

Year-end charts

Certifications

References

Rod Stewart albums
1991 albums
Warner Records albums
Albums produced by Bernard Edwards
Albums produced by Trevor Horn
Albums produced by Patrick Leonard
Albums produced by Lenny Waronker
Albums produced by Richard Perry